Stanley or Stan Williams may refer to:

Sports
Stan Williams (American football) (1929–2015), American football player
Stan Williams (Australian footballer) (1891–1966), Australian rules footballer
Stan Williams (baseball) (1936–2021), American baseball player
Stan Williams (soccer, born 1919) (1919–2007), South African association football player
Stanley Williams (rugby union, born 1886) (1886–1936), Wales-born England international rugby union player
Stanley Williams (rugby union, born 1914) (1914–?), Wales international rugby union player
Stan Williams (speedway rider) (1917–2002), English speedway rider

Others
Stanley Thomas Williams (1888–1956), American literary critic and scholar of Herman Melville.
Stanley Williams (1953–2005), founder of American gang The Crips
Stanley Williams (dancer) (1925–1997), 20th century dancer and instructor
R. Stanley Williams (born 1951), HP Labs scientist